In information theory, Shannon's source coding theorem (or noiseless coding theorem) establishes the limits to possible data compression, and the operational meaning of the Shannon entropy.

Named after Claude Shannon, the source coding theorem shows that (in the limit, as the length of a stream of independent and identically-distributed random variable (i.i.d.) data tends to infinity) it is impossible to compress the data such that the code rate (average number of bits per symbol) is less than the Shannon entropy of the source, without it being virtually certain that information will be lost. However it is possible to get the code rate arbitrarily close to the Shannon entropy, with negligible probability of loss.

The source coding theorem for symbol codes places an upper and a lower bound on the minimal possible expected length of codewords as a function of the entropy of the input word (which is viewed as a random variable) and of the size of the target alphabet.

Statements 
Source coding is a mapping from (a sequence of) symbols from an information source to a sequence of alphabet symbols (usually bits) such that the source symbols can be exactly recovered from the binary bits (lossless source coding) or recovered within some distortion (lossy source coding).  This is the concept behind data compression.

Source coding theorem 
In information theory, the source coding theorem (Shannon 1948) informally states that (MacKay 2003, pg. 81, Cover 2006, Chapter 5):

From a practical point of view, this hypothesis is not always true. Usually, the information that characterizes the source is inserted at the beginning of the transmitted message.

Source coding theorem for symbol codes 
Let  denote two finite alphabets and let  and  denote the set of all finite words from those alphabets (respectively).

Let  denote the random variable given by the length of codeword .

Where  denotes the expected value operator.

Proof: Source coding theorem 
Given  is an i.i.d. source, its time series  is i.i.d. with entropy  in the discrete-valued case and differential entropy in the continuous-valued case. The Source coding theorem states that for any , i.e. for any rate  larger than the entropy of the source, there is large enough  and an encoder that takes  i.i.d. repetition of the source, and maps it to  binary bits such that the source symbols  are recoverable from the binary bits with probability of at least .

Proof of Achievability.

The typical set, is defined as follows:

The Asymptotic Equipartition Property (AEP) shows that for large enough , the probability that a sequence generated by the source lies in the typical set, as defined approaches one.
AEP for a proof).

The definition of typical sets implies that those sequences that lie in the typical set satisfy:

Note that:

Since  bits are enough to point to any string in this set.

The encoding algorithm: The encoder checks if the input sequence lies within the typical set; if yes, it outputs the index of the input sequence within the typical set; if not, the encoder outputs an arbitrary  digit number. As long as the input sequence lies within the typical set (with probability at least ), the encoder doesn't make any error.

Proof of Converse.

Proof: Source coding theorem for symbol codes 
For  let  denote the word length of each possible . Define , where  is chosen so that .  Then

where the second line follows from Gibbs' inequality and the fifth line follows from Kraft's inequality:

so .

For the second inequality we may set

so that

and so

and

and so by Kraft's inequality there exists a prefix-free code having those word lengths. Thus the minimal  satisfies

Extension to non-stationary independent sources

Fixed Rate lossless source coding for discrete time non-stationary independent sources
Define typical set  as:

Then, for given , for  large enough, .

See also
 Channel coding
 Noisy-channel coding theorem
 Error exponent
 Asymptotic Equipartition Property (AEP)

References

Information theory
Coding theory
Data compression
Presentation layer protocols
Mathematical theorems in theoretical computer science
Articles containing proofs